Cristóbal Rodríguez Juárez (also Cristóbal Rodríguez Suárez)(1547 – 4 November 1613) was a Roman Catholic prelate who served as the second Archbishop (Personal Title) of Arequipa (1612–1613) and Archbishop of Santo Domingo (1608–1612).

Biography
Cristóbal Rodríguez Juárez was born in Salamanca, Spain and ordained a priest in the Order of Preachers. On 2 June 1608, he was appointed by the King of Spain and confirmed by Pope Paul V as Archbishop of Santo Domingo. On 16 January 1612, he was appointed by Pope Paul V as Archbishop (Personal Title) of Arequipa where served until his death on 4 November 1613.

References

External links and additional sources
 (for Chronology of Bishops) 
 (for Chronology of Bishops) 
 (for Chronology of Bishops) 
 (for Chronology of Bishops) 

1547 births
1613 deaths
People from Salamanca
Bishops appointed by Pope Paul V
Dominican bishops
Roman Catholic archbishops of Santo Domingo
17th-century Roman Catholic archbishops in the Dominican Republic
17th-century Roman Catholic archbishops in Peru
Roman Catholic bishops of Arequipa